The Central Advisory Commission (CAC) was a body of the Chinese Communist Party (CCP) that existed during the era of the paramount leadership of Deng Xiaoping. The body was supposed to provide "political assistance and consultation" to the CCP Central Committee; however, as the CAC was a select group of senior CCP leadership, it was often seen as having more authority unofficially than that body.

History 
The commission was established after the 12th Party Congress in 1982, and abolished in 1992. Its chairmen were Deng Xiaoping (1982–1987) and Chen Yun (1987–1992). Its membership was offered only to members of the Central Committee with forty years or more of service which made it an important forum for the Eight Elders to remain formally involved in politics. Directors and deputy directors were required to have first served in the Politburo or Standing Committee. Despite being supposedly advisory its power surpassed that of the Politburo Standing Committee and was nicknamed the "Sitting Committee" on account of the advanced age of its members.

See also
Politics of the People's Republic of China
Gerontocracy

References

1982 establishments in China
1992 disestablishments in China
History of the Chinese Communist Party
Organization of the Chinese Communist Party
Organizations disestablished in 1992
Organizations established in 1982
Political history of China